If You Were a Movie, This Would Be Your Soundtrack is the first EP by American post-hardcore band Sleeping with Sirens. The album was released on June 26, 2012, through Rise Records and debuted at no. 17 on the Billboard Top 200 charts, selling 17,486 in the first week. The EP features acoustic versions of "If I'm James Dean, You're Audrey Hepburn" and "With Ears to See and Eyes to Hear," both from the album With Ears to See and Eyes to Hear (2010), along with three new songs. A music video for "Roger Rabbit" was released on October 10, 2012, via mtvU.

Track listing
All lyrics written by Kellin Quinn and Jesse Lawson unless noted, all music composed by Sleeping with Sirens

Personnel
Sleeping with Sirens
 Kellin Quinn - Lead vocals
 Jack Fowler - Lead guitar
 Jesse Lawson - Rhythm guitar, backing vocals
 Justin Hills - Bass guitar, backing vocals 
 Gabe Barham - Percussion

Additional musicians
Jessica Ess - Guest vocals on "Don't You Ever Forget About Me"

Charts

References

External links

If You Were a Movie, This Would Be Your Soundtrack at YouTube (streamed copy where licensed)

Rise Records EPs
2012 EPs
Sleeping with Sirens albums